The men's team rifle was a shooting sports event held as part of the Shooting at the 1912 Summer Olympics programme. It was the second appearance of the event. The competition was held on Saturday, 29 June 1912.

Sixty sport shooters from ten nations competed.

Results

References

External links
 
 

Shooting at the 1912 Summer Olympics